In folklore, crossroads may represent a location "between the worlds" and, as such, a site where supernatural spirits can be contacted and paranormal events can take place. Symbolically, it can mean a locality where two realms touch and therefore represents liminality, a place literally "neither here nor there", "betwixt and between".

Ancient religions

 In Greek mythology, crossroads were associated with both Hecate and Hermes, with shrines and ceremonies for both taking place there. The herm pillar associated with Hermes frequently marked these places due to the god's association with travelers and role as a guide. Though less central to Greek mythology than Hermes, Hecate's connection to crossroads was more cemented in ritual. 'Suppers of Hecate' were left for her at crossroads at each new moon, and one of her most common titles was 'goddess of the crossroads.' In her later three-fold depictions, each of the three heads or bodies is often associated with one of three crossing roads.

"According to the fourth-century historian Philochorus,... at Athens, offerings also were sent to the crossroads on the sixteenth of the month - i.e., half a month after the new-moon offering, at the time of the full moon." In Graeco-Roman society rituals of protection were done at crossroads and purification ritual remains were left at the crossroads. The Greeks and Romans believed doors, gates, rivers, frontiers and crossroads held spiritual meanings regarding transitioning, leaving one area and going somewhere else, a change in directions physically and spiritualty; therefore rituals of protection and rituals regarding change (transition) were done at crossroads.

An 11th-century homily called De Falsis Deis tells us that Mercury or Odin were honored on crossroads.

53. Sum man eac wæs gehaten Mercurius on life, se wæs swyðe facenfull
54. And, ðeah full snotorwyrde, swicol on dædum and on leasbregdum. Ðone
55. macedon þa hæðenan be heora getæle eac heom to mæran gode and æt wega
56. gelætum him lac offrodon oft and gelome þurh deofles lare and to heagum
57. beorgum him brohton oft mistlice loflac.The modern English text gives:
"There was also a man called Mercury, he was very crafty and deceitful in deed and trickeries, though his speech was fully plausible. The heathens made him a renowned god for themselves; at crossroads they offered sacrifices to him frequently and they often erringly brought praise-offerings to hilltops, all through the devil’s teaching. This false god was honored among the heathens in that day, and he is also called by the name Odin in the Danish manner."

Medieval folklore

In Great Britain, Andrews, South Carolina and Ireland there existed a tradition of burying criminals and suicides at the crossroads. This may have been due to the crossroads marking the boundaries of the settlement coupled with a desire to bury those outside of the law outside the settlement, or that the many roads would confuse the dead. Crossroads were also commonly used as a place of criminal punishment and execution (e.g. by gibbet or dule tree), which may have also been a reason for it being a site of suicidal burial as suicide was considered a crime. This ritual of crossroads burial dates back to Anglo-Saxon times and continued until being abolished in 1823.

While they became a place of burial for suicides and others unable to be given proper burial in the Middle Ages, the crossroads were once a burial place second only to the consecrated church for Christians.

In Western folk mythology, a crossroads can be used to summon a demon or devil in order to make a deal.  This legend can be seen in many stories.  For example, the 1587  Historia von D. Johann Fausten, describes the character Faust inscribing magic circles at a crossroads in order to summon the devil.

In the 1885 historical essay Transylvanian Superstitions, Emily Gerard describes how crossroads were often avoided as a matter of course, and describes a Romanian belief that a demon could be summoned at a crossroad by drawing a magic circle, offering copper coin as payment, and reciting an incantation.

Hoodoo

In conjure, rootwork, and hoodoo, a form of African magical spirituality practiced by African Americans in the United States, the crossroads in Hoodoo originates from the Kongo cosmogram in Central Africa. It represents the rising and setting of the sun, and the human life cycle of death and rebirth. The center of the crossroads is where the communication with spirits take place. During the transatlantic slave trade, the Kongo cosmogram was brought to the United States by African slaves. Archeologists unearthed representations of the Kongo cosmogram on slave plantations in South Carolina on clay pots made by enslaved Africans. The Kongo cosmogram is also called the Bakongo cosmogram and the "Yowa" cross. The Yowa cross (Kongo cosmogram) "Is a fork in the road (or even a forked branch) can allude to this crucially important symbol of passage and communication between worlds. The 'turn' in the path,' i.e., the crossroads, remains an indelible concept in the Kongo-Atlantic world, as the point of intersection between the ancestors and the living." "It is at the crossroads where many Africans believe one will witness the powers of God and emerge from the waters spiritually renewed."

Other African origins of the crossroads in Hoodoo are found in West Africa among the Yoruba people. For example, the Yoruba trickster deity called Eshu-Elegba resides at the crossroads, and the Yoruba people leave offerings for Eshu-Elegba at the crossroads. In Hoodoo, there is a spirit that resides at the crossroads to give offering for; however, the word Eshu-Elegba does not exist in Hoodoo because the names of African deities were lost during slavery. Folklorist Newbell Niles Puckett, recorded a number of crossroads rituals in Hoodoo practiced among African-Americans in the South and explained its meaning. Puckett wrote..."Possibly this custom of sacrificing at the crossroads is due to the idea that spirits, like men, travel the highways and would be more likely to hit upon the offering at the crossroads than elsewhere." African crossroads spirits were brought to the United States during the transatlantic slave trade. In the Vodou tradition, Papa Legba is the lwa of crossroads and a messenger to the spirit world. 

In Hoodoo, there has been a practice that is believed to be hoodoo in origin such as selling your soul to the devil at the crossroads in order to acquire facility at various manual and body skills, such as playing a musical instrument, throwing dice, or dancing. It is believed that one may attend upon a crossroads a certain number of times, either at midnight or just before dawn, and one will meet a "black man," whom some call the Devil, who will bestow upon one the desired skills. This practice is believed to have originated from an African American Blues musician by the name of Robert Johnson. In the oral history of hoodoo it is said that Robert Johnson became a skilled Blues musician after he sold his soul to the devil at the crossroads, and because of this, people began going to a crossroads at midnight to sell their soul to a devil to acquire a skill or to become better at a skill. The family of Robert Johnson have come forward and said this is not true. How Johnson became a skilled Blues musician was through training under Ike Zimmerman who was a blues guitarist. In an article from the National Blues Museum it reads... "In the case of Robert Johnson, many family members have come forward to dispel these rumors and have advocated that the truth be told about Robert Johnson. During the time that he was missing, Johnson returned home, where he ran into Ike Zimmerman. Zimmerman took Johnson under his wing, and from years of practicing, Johnson became the legendary Blues musician that we know today." Therefore, the idea one can sell their soul to the devil at the crossroads and acquire a skill may not be traditional in Hoodoo.

Brazilian mythology
Crossroads are very important both in Brazilian mythology (related to the headless mule, the devil, the Besta Fera and the Brazilian version of the werewolf) and religions (as the favourite place for the manifestation of "left-hand" entities such as Exus and where to place offerings to the Orishas). Eshu and Legba derive from the same African deity, although they are viewed in markedly different manners among traditions. For example, Papa Legba is considered by Haitian Vodou practitioners to be closest to Saint Peter, although in Brazilian Quimbanda it is not uncommon to see Exu closely associated with demonic entities such as Lucifer, clad in Mephistophelean attire and bearing a trident.

In modern fiction
Blues songs
Some 20th-century blues songs may be about making a deal with the devil at the crossroads. Many modern listeners believe that the premier song about soul-selling at a crossroads is "Cross Road Blues" by Robert Johnson. According to a legend, Johnson himself sold his soul at a crossroads in order to learn to play the guitar. This is chronicled in the Netflix documentary ReMastered: Devil at the Crossroads''. However, the song's lyrics merely describe a man trying to hitchhike; the sense of foreboding has been interpreted as the singer's apprehension of finding himself, a young black man in the 1920s deep south, alone after dark and at the mercy of passing motorists.

See also
 Crossroads village
 Liminal deities
 Hecate
 Boundary marker#Greece
 Herma

References